Jovana Brakočević Canzian (born 5 March 1988) is a Serbian volleyball player, who was a member of the Serbia women's national volleyball team that won the silver medal at the 2016 Summer Olympics, and also the silver medal at the 2007 European Championship in Belgium and Luxembourg. There she was named Best Server of the tournament. She was also a member of the Serbia women's national volleyball team that won the gold medal at the 2011 European Championship in Serbia and Italy. There she was voted MVP of the tournament.

Career
She played for Serbia at the 2008, 2012 and 2016 Summer Olympics, winning the silver medal in 2016.

She played the 2010/2011 season for the Guangzhou Evergrande in the 361° Chinese Women's Volleyball League.

In June 2011, JT Marvelous announced her joining next season.

Jovana won the gold medal and the MVP and Best Spiker awards at the 2011 European League.

Brakočević won the gold medal at the 2013 Club World Championship and the Most Valuable Player award, playing with Vakıfbank Istanbul.

Clubs
 Poštar 064 Belgrade (2004–2007)
 Spes Volley Conegliano (2007–2010)
 Guangdong Evergrande (2010–2011)
 JT Marvelous (2011–2012)
 Vakıfbank Istanbul (2012–2014)
 Azeryol Baku (2014–2015)
 Liu Jo Nordmeccanica Modena (2016–2017)
 Altay VC (2017)
 CSM Bucuresti (2018)
 Budowlani Łódź (2018–2019)
 AGIL Volley (2019–2020)
 KPS Chemik Police (2020–)

Awards

Individuals

 2007 European Championship "Best Server"
 2007 Best Sportswoman of Vojvodina
 2010 European League "Best Spiker"
 2010–11 Chinese Volleyball League "Most Valuable Player"
 2011 European League "Most Valuable Player"
 2011 European League "Best Spiker"
 2011 World Grand Prix "Best Scorer"
 2011 European Championship "Most Valuable Player"
 2011 "Best Sportswoman" by Olympic Committee of Serbia
 2011 Best Sportswoman of Vojvodina
 2012–13 CEV Champions League "Most Valuable Player"
 2012-13 Turkish League Final Series "Best Scorer"
 2013 World Grand Prix "Best Opposite Spiker"
 2013 FIVB Club World Championship "Most Valuable Player"
 2013 CEV European Championship best spiker

Clubs
 2010-11 Chinese League Championship -  Runner-Up, with Guangzhou Evergrande
 2012-13 Turkish Cup -  Champion, with Vakıfbank Spor Kulübü
 2012–13 CEV Champions League -  Champion, with Vakıfbank Spor Kulübü
 2012-13 Turkish Women's Volleyball League -  Champion, with Vakıfbank Spor Kulübü
 2013 Club World Championship -  Champion, with Vakıfbank Istanbul
 2018 Romanian League -  Champion, with CSM Bucuresti
 2018-19  Runner-up, with Budowlani Łódź
 2020-21 Polish Cup,    Champion, with KPS Chemik Police

References

External links

Glas javnosti: Buntovnica sa razlogom, Interview with Brakočević, 30 April 2006 

1988 births
Living people
Sportspeople from Zrenjanin
Serbian women's volleyball players
Olympic volleyball players of Serbia
Volleyball players at the 2008 Summer Olympics
Volleyball players at the 2012 Summer Olympics
Volleyball players at the 2016 Summer Olympics
Olympic medalists in volleyball
Olympic silver medalists for Serbia
Medalists at the 2016 Summer Olympics
European champions for Serbia
Expatriate volleyball players in Italy
Expatriate volleyball players in China
Expatriate volleyball players in Japan
Expatriate volleyball players in Turkey
Expatriate volleyball players in Azerbaijan
Expatriate volleyball players in Romania
Serbian expatriate sportspeople in Italy
Serbian expatriate sportspeople in China
Serbian expatriate sportspeople in Japan
Serbian expatriate sportspeople in Turkey
Serbian expatriate sportspeople in Azerbaijan
Serbian expatriate sportspeople in Romania
JT Marvelous players
VakıfBank S.K. volleyballers
Universiade medalists in volleyball
Universiade silver medalists for Serbia
Medalists at the 2009 Summer Universiade
Serie A1 (women's volleyball) players